Todd Woodbridge and Mark Woodforde were the defending champions, but did not participate this year.

Dave Randall and Greg Van Emburgh won in the final 6–7(2–7), 6–2, 7–6(7–2), against Luke Jensen and Murphy Jensen.

Seeds

Draw

Draw

External links
Draw

Delray Beach Open
1997 ATP Tour